Edward Corbett may refer to:
 Edward Corbett (artist) (1919–1971), abstract expressionist artist
 Edward P. J. Corbett (1919–1998), American author
 Edward Corbett (politician) (1817–1895), MP for South Shropshire 1868–77
 Edward Corbet of the Corbet baronets

See also
 Ted Corbett (disambiguation)
 Edward Corbet (1603–1658), English clergyman and member of the Westminster Assembly